The Horseneck Tract was an area in present-day Essex County, New Jersey, United States, that consisted of what are now the municipalities of Caldwell, West Caldwell, North Caldwell, Fairfield, Verona, Cedar Grove, Essex Fells, Roseland, and portions of Livingston and West Orange.

History
On May 1, 1701, Dutch Settlers Simon Van Ness, Gerebrand Clawson, Hans Spier, Elias Franson, Christopher Steinmets, Andrese Louwrentz, Garret Vanderhoof, Hessell Pieters and Jan Spier bought from the Indians a large tract of land at Horseneck. This acreage could not be determined because all of the boundaries were Indian named points and places. The first accurate surveys began to be recorded 12 years later.

In 1702, English settlers purchased another 14,000 acre (57 km2) section of the Horseneck Tract from the Lenape Native Americans for goods equal to $325. This purchase encompassed much of western Essex County, from the First Mountain to the Passaic River. Settlement began about 1740 by Thomas Gould and Saunders Sanders. The reason for calling the region "Horse Neck" has never been determined, but is not because of its shape.

The area was referred to as the Horseneck Tract until February 17, 1787, when the congregation of the First Presbyterian Church at Horseneck voted to change the name of their parish to Caldwell, in honor of Reverend James Caldwell who helped them organize the church. After this date the church became known as the First Presbyterian Church at Caldwell. In 1798 the westernmost portion of Newark Township, including the Parish of Caldwell, was renamed Caldwell Township.

Caldwell Borough contained what is today the towns of West Caldwell and Caldwell. Soon after, the area of Caldwell Township just to the east of Caldwell Borough between Caldwell Borough and Montclair (present-day Verona and Cedar Grove) decided to follow Caldwell's lead and incorporated itself as its own borough, Verona. Some of the already-developed eastern neighborhoods of Caldwell Township chose to become part of Montclair, as it was a rapidly developing suburb of Newark and Paterson. At around the same time, the area north of Caldwell Borough became its own town, North Caldwell. The wooded area directly to the southeast of downtown Caldwell Borough became Essex Fells, while the farmland to the south of Caldwell township was briefly called South Caldwell. This area underwent other changes when the towns of Livingston and West Orange expanded. The South Caldwell region, still part of Caldwell Township became Roseland.

At this point, all that remained of the original Caldwell Township was 6,624 acres of farmlands and undeveloped meadows in the northwesternmost part of Essex County. Eventually, in 1963, Caldwell Township changed its name to Fairfield in order to avoid being confused with Caldwell Borough.

See also
Elizabethtown Tract
English Neighborhood
Monmouth Tract
New Barbadoes Neck
Newark Tract
West Essex
https://www.07004history.com/blog/the-horseneck-tract

References

External links
 A History of the Horseneck Riots: Chapter 1 (via RootsWeb)
 The Legacy of the Early Founders of the New Haven Colony who came to Newark, New Jersey in 1666 (via RootsWeb)

Geography of Essex County, New Jersey
Pre-statehood history of New Jersey